Caddy is a given name and a nickname.  Caddy (surname) is also a surname. Caddy serves as an alternate form of the given names Candace, Caroline and Carolina.

Given name
 Caddy Adzuba (born 1981), Congolese lawyer, journalist and women's rights activist
 Caddy McKeown (born 1951), American politician

Middle name
Sir Victor Caddy Davies, known as Victor Davies (horticulturalist) (1887–1977), New Zealand nurseryman and horticulturist

Fictional character
Candace "Caddy" Compson, from The Sound and the Fury by  William Faulkner

Mononym
 Caddy (fl. 1990s), Romanian musician in B.U.G. Mafia
 Caddy stagename of Tomas Dahl (fl 2008–2010), drummer for Norwegian rock band Turbonegro

Nickname
 Caddy Cadore, nickname of Leon Cadore (1891–1958), American baseball player
 Pierce Caddy Works (1896–1982), American basketball and baseball

See also

Caddy (surname)
Cady (given name)
Cady (surname)
Candy (name)
Cardy (surname)
Cuddy (surname)